Caecum jonatani is a species of minute sea snail, a marine gastropod mollusc or micromollusc in the family Caecidae.

Description

Distribution

References

Caecidae
Gastropods described in 2007